

Results

Scottish Premier Division

Final standings

Results by round

Scottish League Cup

Scottish Cup

European Cup Winners' Cup

References

 

Aberdeen F.C. seasons
Aberdeen
Aberdeen